United Nations Security Council resolution 1380, adopted unanimously on 27 November 2001, after reaffirming all previous resolutions on Western Sahara, including Resolution 1359 (2001), the Council extended the mandate of the United Nations Mission for the Referendum in Western Sahara (MINURSO) until 28 February 2002.

MINURSO's mandate was extended to allow additional time for consultations on a settlement of the issue by James Baker with Morocco and the Polisario Front. The Secretary-General Kofi Annan was requested to inform the Council of significant developments by 15 January 2002 and to provide an assessment of the situation by 18 February 2002.

See also
 Free Zone (region)
 Political status of Western Sahara
 List of United Nations Security Council Resolutions 1301 to 1400 (2000–2002)
 Sahrawi Arab Democratic Republic
 Moroccan Western Sahara Wall

References

External links
 
Text of the Resolution at undocs.org

 1380
2001 in Morocco
2001 in Western Sahara
 1380
 1380
November 2001 events